KBIQ (102.7 FM), known as "Q102.7", is a Christian adult contemporary radio station in Manitou Springs, Colorado, serving the Colorado Springs, Colorado, area of the United States. The station is owned by the Salem Media Group.

102.7 history

The current 102.7 license began life at 104.9 MHz in July 1953 as KCMS, "Colorado's Classical Music Station". It was owned by Bud Edmonds, doing business as the Garden of the Gods Broadcasting Company; Edmonds built the facility, the first stereo FM radio station west of the Mississippi River. Edmonds operated KCMS out of a studio he built in his garage at 68 Minnehaha Avenue. At times, Edmonds and his wife would take turns operating the Seeburg record changer, announcing the music that was being played and changing the albums. In 1956, KCMS moved to 102.7 MHz and gained an AM simulcast partner, KCMS 1490 (now KXRE); the FM tower was moved to the top of Cheyenne Mountain.

In early 1970, Edmonds sold KCMS-AM-FM to a group of retired Air Force officers doing business as the Black Forest Development Company. to take the AM station into an "information and education" format, taking the call letters KEDI. The FM became a music station, playing classical during the day, and free form album rock at night.

By 1973 the station was a full-time contemporary music station using the moniker "KEDI-KCMS, Colorado's Music Mother", programmed by Colorado Springs top 40 radio pioneer Steve Scott. It was the first Top 40 station on FM, and led the move to the band by music stations, finally defeating former top 40 legend KYSN. Never a financial success, KEDI-KCMS was sold in 1974 to Mountain States Broadcasting, who moved the studios to a location on Manitou Avenue, changing the call letters to KIIQ, still playing a top-40 format, but one that was less aggressive.  In 1979 Wikes/Abaris Commutations acquired KIIQ. 

In the early 1980s, KIIQ broadcast a modern rock format. In 1984, it returned to its roots as a CHR as KIKX (Kicks 102.7), becoming one of the top rated stations in the market.  In 1989, Wikes/Abaris sold KIKX to First Sierra Communications, but after First Sierra went bankrupt in 1990 Wikes/Abaris would reacquire KIKX.  

In 1988 KIKX got competition from not one but two CHR move-in's from Pueblo. First in the spring KATM (The Kat) moved in with a similarly programmed station, while later in the fall, KKMG moved in with a Rhythmic Crossover leaning CHR. KIKX responded with KKMG moving into the market by leaning Rhythmic but would move back to a Mainstream playlist.

However, KKMG became the dominant CHR in the market and KIKX bowed out of the format, and flipped back to a Modern Rock station in 1993 but keeping the KIKX calls and using "The Max" moniker. It switched to a satellite fed country music station a year later, and in 1995 flipped to an all '70s format using the "Kicks" moniker.

In the fall of 1996, Salem Communications brought KIKX and moved its Christian AC outlet KBIQ from 96.1 to 102.7 and has remained Christian AC ever since.

KBIQ history
KBIQ signed on in 1993 on 96.1 FM. The station was originally owned by The Word in Music Inc. (known today as Bethesda Christian Broadcasting). The owners were a Not-For-Profit company but the station sold commercial air time since it did not broadcast between 88.1 & 91.9. The station did several fund raisers asking for money from listeners. The station was linked by four other stations that were also owned by TWIM by a satellite network called TWIM. In 1996 TWIM sold KBIQ to Salem Communications which was a for profit corporation. The station continued to broadcast on 96.1 until Salem bought KIKX 102.7 in the fall of the same year.  TWIM continued to operate the satellite service until the fall of 1996 when Salem Communications brought "The Word in Music" network which they would continue to operate until 1999. After the network dissolved KBIQ became a locally programmed Christian AC.

Before the KBIQ callsign existed in Colorado Springs, it was the callsign for the Contemporary Christian Music station in Seattle now known as Spirit 105.3/KCMS. In Seattle, KBIQ was operated by King's Garden Ministries from the 1960s to about 1984. In 1984, King's Garden changed its name to Crista Ministries and KBIQ changed its callsign to KCMS at the same time.  The KCMS callsign had originated in Colorado Springs earlier, on what is now KBIQ.

References

External links
Q102.7 official website

FCC History Cards for KBIQ

BIQ
BIQ
Manitou Springs, Colorado
Radio stations established in 1964
1964 establishments in Colorado
Salem Media Group properties